Harley Marques Silva (born 6 July 1974 in Rio de Janeiro) is a beach volleyball player from Brazil.

Team Harley – Pedro, was placed as #5 on the international Olympic ranking for the 2008 Summer Olympics, but did not qualify because of the two teams per country rule.

Harley – Pedro was ranked as #2 on the beach volley world ranking per 21 July 2008, and #1 per 4 August and 17 November 2008.

Playing partners
 Pedro Solberg Salgado
 Benjamin Insfran
 Franco Neto
 Rogerio Ferreira
 Alison Cerutti
 Luizao Correa
 Fred Souza

References
 

1974 births
Living people
Brazilian men's beach volleyball players
Volleyball players from Rio de Janeiro (city)
21st-century Brazilian people